This is the list of public holidays in Kyrgyzstan:

{|class="wikitable" style="font-size:95%;"
|- style="background:#efefef;"
! style="width:80px;"|Date !! style="width:170px;"|English name
! Local name/s
! Notes
|-
|January 1 || New Year's Day
|Жаңы жыл Новый Год (Novyy God)
|style="font-size:95%;"|
|-
|January 7 || Orthodox Christmas
|пайгамбардын туулган күнү Рождество Христово (Rojdestvo hrıstovo / Rozhdestvo Khristovo)
|style="font-size:95%;"|Celebrated by local Orthodox Christians
|-
|February 23 || Fatherland Defender's Day 
|Мекенди коргоочунун күнү День защитника Отечества
|style="font-size:95%;"|Formation of the Red Army in February 1918.
|-
|March 8 || International Women's Day
|style="white-space:nowrap;"|Эл аралык аялдар күнү Международный женский день (Mezhdunarodnyy zhenskiy den''')
|style="font-size:95%;"|
|-
|March 21 || Nooruz Mairamy
|Нооруз
|style="font-size:95%;"|Which is originally the Persian New Year, is traditionally a springtime holiday marking the beginning of a new year.
|-
|April 7 || Day of the People's April Revolution
| style="white-space:nowrap;" | Элдик Апрель революциясы күнү
| style="font-size:95%;" |Commemorates the Second Kyrgyz Revolution of 2010.
|-
|May 1 || International Workers' Day
|Эмгек күнү
|style="font-size:95%;"|
|-
|May 5 || Constitution Day
|Кыргыз Республикасынын конституция күнү День Конституции Кыргызская Республики (Den' Konstitutsii Kyrgyzskaya Respubliki)
|style="font-size:95%;"|
|-
|May 9 || Great Patriotic War Against Fascism Victory Day
|Жеңиш күнү День Победы (Den' Pobedy)
|style="font-size:95%;"|A holiday in the former Soviet Union carried over
to present-day Kazakhstan and other former republics (Except Baltic Countries and Ukraine).
|-
|August 31 || Independence Day
|Кыргыз Республикасынын Эгемендүүлүк күнү День независимости (Den' nezavisimosti)
|style="font-size:95%;"|
|-Honors the Independence of Kyrgyzstan from the Soviet Union in 1991.
|November 7–8 || Days of History and Commemoration of Ancestors
|Тарых күн жана аталардын эскерүү
| style="font-size:95%;" |Two-day holiday commemorating the national liberation uprising and the tragic events of 1916 known as Urkun.

Previously, from independence to 2017, the country celebrated the Great October Socialist Revolution. It has now been replaced with День примирения и согласия ("Day of Reconciliation and Agreement"), celebrated on a Nov. 7 (at least officially) before amendments in Labour Codex (adopted in December 2004, new holiday, which celebrates at November 4 is the People Unity Day ("День народного единства)"
|-
|Defined by lunar calendar || Orozo Ait
|Орозо айт
|style="font-size:95%;"|Feast of Fast-breaking
|-
|Celebrated 70 days after the Orozo Ait || Kurman Ait
|Курман айт
|style="font-size:95%;"|Feast of Sacrifice
|}

Two additional Muslim holidays Orozo Ait and Kurman Ait are defined by lunar calendar.

Other holidays
 Day of the Armed Forces - 29 May
 Day of Aviation - August 18

References

 National holidays on Kyrgyzstan government web site. Retrieved on 8 March 2009
 R. Stewart and S. Weldon, Kyrgyzstan'', Odyssey, 2002, p. 105, 

 
Kyrgyzstan
Events in Kyrgyzstan
Kyrgyzstani culture